Tsz Ching Estate is a public housing estate located in Tsz Wan Shan, Kowloon, Hong Kong next to Tsz Oi Court. It consists of eleven residential blocks completed between 1993 and 2001. The site was formerly Blocks 48 to 53 in Tsz Wan Shan Estate, which was also called "Tsz Ching Estate". After redevelopment, the eastern part of Old Tsz Oi Estate was assigned to Tsz Ching Estate.

Tsz Oi Court is a Home Ownership Scheme court in Tsz Wan Shan, next to Tsz Ching Estate. The site was formerly Tsz Oi Estate, which included Blocks 33 to 47 in Tsz Wan Shan Estate. In 1985, Block 40 was found to have structural problems by the Hong Kong Housing Authority. After redevelopment, the estate was converted to HOS housing and was developed into 3 phases. Phase 1 and 2 has six residential blocks built in 1997 while Phase 3 has six residential blocks built in 2000.

Houses

Tsz Ching Estate

Tsz Oi Court

Demographics
According to the 2016 by-census, Tsz Ching Estate had a population of 25,844 while Tsz Oi Court had a population of 12,635. Altogether the population amounts to 38,479.

Politics
For the 2019 District Council election, the estate fell within two constituencies. Most of the estate falls within the Ching On constituency, which was formerly represented by Wong Yat-yuk until July 2021, while Ching Tak House, Ching Wo House and Tsz Oi Court fall within the Ching Oi constituency, which was formerly represented by Eddie Sham Yu-hin until July 2021.

See also

Public housing estates in Tsz Wan Shan

References

Tsz Wan Shan
Public housing estates in Hong Kong
Residential buildings completed in 1980
Residential buildings completed in 1993
Residential buildings completed in 1996
Residential buildings completed in 1999
Residential buildings completed in 2001